Impromptu is a  musical form or genre.

Impromptu may also refer to:

Arts, entertainment, and media

Films
 Impromptu (1932 film), a comedy short starring Richard Bird and Florence Desmond
 Impromptu (1991 film), a movie starring Hugh Grant as Chopin

Literature
 Impromptu, a 1923 novel by Elliot Paul

Music
 Impromptu (June Christy album), a 1977 album by June Christy
 Impromptu (Billy Taylor album), a 1962 album by jazz pianist Billy Taylor
 Impromptus (Schubert)

Other uses
 Impromptu (programming environment), a Scheme-based live programming environment
 Impromptu speaking